

Scientists associated with the Kharkiv mathematical school 

 Aleksandr Lyapunov (e.g., Lyapunov function, Lyapunov exponent)
 Konstantin Andreev
 Vladimir Steklov
 Mikhail Ostrogradsky
 Sergei Bernstein (e.g., Bernstein polynomial)
 Yakov Geronimus (e.g., Geronimus polynomial)  
 Anton Sushkevich
 Dmitrii Sintsov
 Naum Akhiezer
 Lev Landau (e.g., Landau theory, Ginzburg–Landau theory)
 Boris Levin
 Vladimir Marchenko
 Aleksei Pogorelov
 Mikhail Kadets
 Leonid Pastur
 Alexandre Eremenko
 Vladimir Drinfeld (e.g., Drinfeld reciprocity)
 Valentina Borok
 Vitali Milman

Some currently active senior scientists 
 Leonid Pastur
 Eugen Khruslov
 Mariya Shcherbina
 Igor Chueshov
 Vladimir Kadets
 Igor Chudinovich
 Iossif Ostrovskii
 Valery Korobov
 Alexander Borisenko

Footnotes and references
 O'Connor, John J. & Robertson, Edmund F., "Kharkiv Mathematical Society", MacTutor History of Mathematics archive
 Mathematics in Kharkiv (in Russian)
 Kharkiv Mathematical Society (in Russian)
 Journal of Mathematical Physics, Analysis, Geometry

Education in Kharkiv
Schools in Ukraine